The Worldly Madonna is a 1922 American silent drama film directed by Harry Garson and starring Clara Kimball Young and William P. Carleton.

Plot
A nun at the convent, Janet Trevor plans to save her sister Lucy, who's been framed for murder, by switching places with her. As she steps into the spotlight of the cabaret where her sister works, she discovers a possible victim: John McBride, a politician loved by both. Meanwhile, restaurant entrepreneur Allan Graves threatens McBride and accuses Janet, who mistakes her for Lucy, of having been a witness to the murder that John is accused of. Confessing to the crime is a hunchback named Ramez, but not until the deception of the girls is made public. Graves refuses this offer and accuses Lucy of being a drug addict. Though she confesses to the sin, she denies that neither she nor McBride were involved in the murder. It is soon revealed the victim wasn't murdered at all, but rather bribed to leave the country so that Graves could get McBride in his position. After the presentation of the evidence, Mcbride confesses his love for Janet while Lucy leads a new, fruitful life thanks to her selfless sister.

Cast
 Clara Kimball Young as Lucy Trevor, dancer / Janet Trevor, nun
 William P. Carleton as John McBride
 Richard Tucker as Alan Graves
 George Hackathorne as Ramez
 Jean de Limur as Toni Lorenz
 William Marion as Dr. Krell
 Milla Davenport as Jail Matron

References

External links

 
 
 
 
 The Worldly Madonna at silenthollywood.com
 The Worldly Madonna information site
 The Worldly Madonna silent film clip at Nuray Pictures

1922 films
1922 drama films
American silent feature films
American black-and-white films
1920s English-language films
Silent American drama films
Articles containing video clips
Films directed by Harry Garson
1920s American films